ANY may refer to:
ANY (magazine), a New York-based architectural journal published from 1993 to 2000
Anthony Municipal Airport's IATA airport code
Athabasca Northern Railway's reporting mark

See also
some and any, for usage of these two English words
Universal quantification, a logical quantifier expressed as "given any"